Artona hainana is a species of moth in the family Zygaenidae. It is found in Taiwan, China, India, Thailand, Singapore and Malaysia.

References

Moths described in 1876
Procridinae
Moths of Asia
Taxa named by Arthur Gardiner Butler